Gjermund Hagesæter (born 12 December 1960 in Lindås) is a Norwegian politician representing the Progress Party. He is currently a representative of Hordaland in the Storting and was first elected in 2001.

In 2011 he applied for the position as County Governor of Sogn og Fjordane, but was not appointed.

References

 Fremskrittspartiet - Biography

1960 births
Living people
People from Lindås
Hordaland politicians
Progress Party (Norway) politicians
Members of the Storting
21st-century Norwegian politicians